Alison Van Uytvanck (born 26 March 1994) is a Belgian professional tennis player.

Van Uytvanck has won five singles and two doubles WTA Tour titles and three Challenger Tour singles titles, as well as 12 singles and two doubles titles on the ITF Circuit. In August 2018, she reached her best singles ranking of world No. 37.

Personal life
Van Uytvanck was born in the small town of Grimbergen to René Van Uytvanck and Krista Laemers. She started playing tennis at age five when her older brother Sean introduced her to the game. She has a twin brother named Brett. Van Uytvanck graduated from high school at Sint-Donatus in Merchtem. As a junior, she alternated between training with local coach Sacha Katsnelson and the Flemish Tennis Association, where she was coached by Ann Devries. She admires Roger Federer, and her compatriot Kim Clijsters. Van Uytvanck was in a relationship with fellow Belgian tennis player Greet Minnen.

Career

2011: WTA debut
In 2011, she won four ITF singles titles in Vale Do Lobo (Portugal), Dijon (France), Edinburgh and Sunderland (both UK). She also reached the final in Tessenderlo (Belgium) where she lost to Anna-Lena Grönefeld.

She played at the Brussels Open where she entered as a qualifier by defeating Margalita Chakhnashvili 6–3, 6–2 (1st round of qualifying draw), Laura Siegemund, 2–6, 6–4, 6–3 (2nd round of qualifying draw) and Hsieh Su-wei, 6–4, 2–6, 6–4 (3rd round of qualifying draw). She faced Patty Schnyder in the first round of the main draw and defeated her 6–3, 2–6, 6–2. In her next match against a compatriot, Yanina Wickmayer, she ultimately lost 6–7(2), 4–6.

She also qualified for the main draw at 's-Hertogenbosch, where she lost to Alexandra Dulgheru.

2012: WTA quarterfinal 
In 2012, she won a fifth ITF singles title in Glasgow, and reached the final in Kaarst (Germany). In February, she debuted in Fed Cup against Serbia, where she was chosen by coach Ann Devries over Kirsten Flipkens in the deciding doubles rubber. Partnering Yanina Wickmayer, they lost the match (and by extension, the tie) in 3 sets.

She took part in the 2012 Brussels Open where she received a wildcard into the main draw. She defeated Ksenia Pervak  in her first round match and then beat Chanelle Scheepers in three sets to advance to her first WTA quarterfinals, where she was defeated by top seed and world No. 3, Agnieszka Radwańska, in straight sets. Van Uytvanck went on, having more success on the ITF Circuit.

2013: First WTA Challenger title
In 2013, Van Uytvanck won her first WTA 125 title by winning the Taipei Ladies Open when she defeated Dinah Pfizenmaier in the semifinals, and compatriot Yanina Wickmayer in the final.

2014: Grand Slam debut
She played in the main draw of all four of the Grand Slam tournaments and reached the second round at Wimbledon for the first time in her career.

2015–16: French Open quarterfinal, top 50 debut and injury
In 2015, she reached the quarterfinal of the French Open, which she lost in two sets to Timea Bacsinszky. She reached a new career-high ranking of No. 41 later that year, in October. 

However, a growth on her right ankle resulted in her missing a number of tournaments in the 2016 clay-court season, including the 2016 French Open, and her failure to defend her quarterfinalist points from 2015 caused her to fall out of the top 100 in June 2016.

2017: First WTA title
After a long hiatus due to injury, and a comeback, Van Uytvanck won her first WTA title at Tournoi de Québec beating Timea Babos, in three sets.

2018: Second singles & maiden doubles titles, Wimbledon 4th round, top 40
Van Uytvanck won her second WTA title in February at Hungarian Ladies Open defeating Dominika Cibulková in a long three-set battle in the final.

She eliminated defending champion Garbine Muguruza in the second round of Wimbledon, losing just three games after dropping the first set 5–7. It was her first win over a top-10 opponent and arguably the best match performance of her career so far. After a win over Anett Kontaveit in the third round, she lost in the fourth round to Daria Kasatkina.
In August 2018, she reached a new career-high ranking of No. 37.

She ended the year winning her first WTA Tour doubles title in Luxembourg, alongside Greet Minnen.

2019–21: Three singles titles
In February 2019, Uytvanck successfully defended her title in Budapest, defeating Markéta Vondroušová in the final.
In September, she won the Tashkent Open, and she did not drop a set until the final, in which she defeated fifth seed and 2008 champion, Sorana Cîrstea, in three sets.

In February 2020, she narrowly lost a semifinal in Lyon to 2020 Australian Open champion, top-10 player and eventual champion, Sofia Kenin, in three sets with three tiebreaks.

In 2021, she won her fifth WTA Tour singles title at the Astana Open, beating local player Putintseva in the final.

Equipment and apparel
Van Uytvanck previously played with the Prince O3 Tour racquet. She now plays with the Snauwaert Grinta 100 lite, a 100 square inch tennis racquet with 22 mm dual taper beam, 285 g weight. She has a contract with the South Korean sporting goods company Fila apparel.

Performance timelines

Only main-draw results in WTA Tour, Grand Slam tournaments, Fed Cup/Billie Jean King Cup and Olympic Games are included in win–loss records.

Singles
Current after the 2023 Linz Open.

Doubles

WTA career finals

Singles: 5 (5 titles)

Doubles: 4 (2 titles, 2 runner-ups)

WTA 125 tournament finals

Singles: 4 (3 titles, 1 runner-up)

Doubles: 2 (2 runner–ups)

ITF Circuit finals

Singles: 20 (13 titles, 7 runner–ups)

Doubles: 4 (2 titles, 2 runner–ups)

WTA Tour career earnings

Head-to-head records

Record against top 10 players
Van Uytvanck's record against players who have been ranked in the top 10. Active players are in boldface.

Top 10 wins

Notes

References

External links

 Official website 
 
 
 
 
 
 

1994 births
Living people
Belgian female tennis players
Olympic tennis players of Belgium
Sportspeople from Flemish Brabant
People from Vilvoorde
Lesbian sportswomen
Belgium LGBT sportspeople
LGBT tennis players
Tennis players at the 2020 Summer Olympics
21st-century Belgian LGBT people